The  is a continuation of two other rivers, the Hozu River, a small, speedy river which begins in the mountains near Kameoka and then slithers through the mountains separating Kameoka and Kyoto; and the Ōi River (大堰川 Ōi-gawa), which emerges from those mountains and expands into a shallow, slow-flowing river until Togetsukyo Bridge in Arashiyama. From that point forward, the river is referred to as the Katsura River, and its flow continues for several kilometers through Kyoto Prefecture until it joins the Kamo and Uji rivers.

The Katsura River area features some of the oldest shrines in Kyoto and Japan, such as Matsuo Shrine, and, as a counterpoint to the channelled Kamo River, supports acres of agricultural area on its flood plain. It also is known for its summer supply of ayu and is a popular place for holding barbecues.

See also
 Katsura, Kyoto

References

External links
 (confluence with Kizu River and Uji River)

Rivers of Kyoto Prefecture
Rivers of Japan